Elizabeth Mary Claire Fisher  is a British geneticist and Professor at University College London. Her research investigates the degeneration of motor neurons during amyotrophic lateral sclerosis and Alzheimer's disease triggered by Down syndrome.

Education 
Fisher studied physiological sciences at the University of Oxford where she was an undergraduate student at St Anne's College, Oxford in 1981. After completing her undergraduate studies Fisher left science and trained as a typist and worked in several different jobs in UK and Australia and in 1983 moved to Imperial College London, where she worked on mouse molecular genetics. At St Mary's Hospital, London Fisher completed microdissection on the mouse X chromosome. During her doctoral research she worked alongside Mary F. Lyon and Stephen Brown at the Medical Research Council in Harwell. She dissected individual chromosomes and cloned DNA fragments into plasmids.

Career and research
After graduating from Imperial College London in 1986, Fisher moved to the United States, where she was appointed a postdoctoral fellow at Massachusetts Institute of Technology (MIT). At MIT, Fisher worked as a postdoc in the lab of David C. Page on Turner syndrome. Her early work looked at the male sex determining factor and then considered the genes responsible for Turner syndrome. Fisher returned to Imperial College London in 1990, when she was awarded a Royal Society University Research Fellowship to start an independent research group looking at aneuploidy. In collaboration with Victor Tybulewicz of the MRC, she was awarded Wellcome Trust research funding in 1991, which allowed her to expand her research into a new model of Down syndrome. In 2001 Fisher was appointed Professor at University College London and in 2017 she also set up a lab at the Medical Research Council Mouse Genetics Unit in Harwell. Her research considers motor neuron degeneration, genome editing and the development of mouse models to understand neurological disorders.

Fisher received the 2011 Faculty Member of the Year Award for Neurological Disorders on Faculty of 1000 (F1000) and an Addgene Blue Flame Award in 2017 for depositing a plasmid that has been shared more than 100 times. Fisher serves as an academic editor on the journal PLoS Genetics and on the boards for the journals Disease Models and Mechanism, Mammalian Genome.

In 2003, work from Fisher's lab provided one of the first demonstrations in a mammalian model of the link between defects in retrograde transport and neurodegeneration. In a paper published in Science, Fisher found that two spontaneous mouse mutants generated from an ENU (N-ethyl-N-nitrosourea) screen harbored missense point mutations in the cytoplasmic dynein heavy chain gene. In cells, dynein is the motor protein that moves cargos toward the minus end of microtubules. These mutants were named Loa (Legs at odd angles) and Cra1 (Cramping 1) due to the phenotypes of body twisting and hindlimb clenching when suspended by the tail. Heterozygotes show locomotion defects with neuronal loss. Homozygotes are unable to feed and move and die within 24 hours of birth, but embryonic neurons have intracellular inclusions that are positive for ubiquitin, SOD, CDK5, and neurofilament.

Fisher and Tybulewicz have demonstrated that mouse models can be used to understand the genes that give rise to certain aspects of Down syndrome. Fisher and Tybulewicz were the first to successfully introduce an almost full-length human chromosome into mice – a significant technical achievement, as it had previously only been possible to introduce small fragments of chromosomes. People with Down syndrome, a condition which occurs due to trisomy on Chromosome 21, are particularly susceptible to Alzheimer's disease. The mouse models that Fisher and Tybulewicz created have allowed scientists to study the genes responsible for complex conditions, which allows her to design synthetic chromosomes for gene therapy. Fisher has investigated a series of proteins that are modified by Alzheimer's disease and impacted by trisomy.

Fisher develops new models for Amyotrophic lateral sclerosis (ALS) that occurs due to mutations in the gene FUS. ALS is a form of motor neuron disease that occurs during middle age, whereas spinal muscular atrophy is the most common genetic killer of children. Whilst it is well known that certain genes cause motor neuron disease, it is not clear how mutations impact the disease progression. Working with Medical Research Council Harwell; Fisher has looked at the molecular changes that occur during ALS. She has investigated how the RNA-binding protein mutant FUS behaves in mouse models.  Fisher serves as a Council Member at the Academy of Medical Sciences.

Selected publications 
 The sex-determining region of the human Y chromosome encodes a finger protein
 Genealogies of mouse inbred strains
 Mutations in the endosomal ESCRTIII-complex subunit CHMP2B in frontotemporal dementia

Awards and honours
She was elected a Fellow of the Academy of Medical Sciences (FMedSci) in 2007 and a Fellow of the Royal Society of Biology (FRSB) in 2010. She was made a Faculty of 1000 member in 2010. In 2013 she was elected to Academia Net. In 2019 Fisher appeared on The Life Scientific.

References 

Living people
Year of birth missing (living people)
Fellows of the Academy of Medical Sciences (United Kingdom)
British neuroscientists
Fellows of the Royal Society of Biology
British women neuroscientists
Alumni of the University of Oxford
Alumni of Imperial College London
Royal Society University Research Fellows